Altkalen is a municipality in the Rostock district, in Mecklenburg-Vorpommern, Germany.

History
Kalen was first mentioned in a document from 1174. The name "Kalen" is of Slavic origin and means "marsh" or "morass". After 1236, Kalen was expanded as a city with a strong fortification.

References

1250s establishments in the Holy Roman Empire
1253 establishments in Europe
Grand Duchy of Mecklenburg-Schwerin